The ChS8 is an electric mainline AC passenger locomotive used in Russia and Ukraine.

The 8 axle locomotive was developed for pulling long passenger trains (28–32 carriages) at speeds around 100 km/h or faster. In 1983 the first two experimental locomotives were constructed and
delivered to Kyiv for tests and adjustment. In 1987 30 locomotives were built as a mass model. In 1989 last 50 locomotives were built.

As the most powerful AC passenger locomotive in USSR designed for long trains, ChS8 experienced a low demand when after the disintegration of the USSR passenger turnover in both Russia and Ukraine fell significantly. After 2010 Russian railways turned to more energy-effective EP10 and EP20 as powerful locomotives for fast or long passenger trains.

See also

 The Museum of the Moscow Railway, at Paveletsky Rail Terminal, Moscow
 Rizhsky Rail Terminal, Home of the Moscow Railway Museum
 Varshavsky Rail Terminal, St.Petersburg, Home of the Central Museum of Railway Transport, Russian Federation
 History of rail transport in Russia

References 

Electric locomotives of Russia
Electric locomotives of the Soviet Union
25 kV AC locomotives
5 ft gauge locomotives
Railway locomotives introduced in 1983